†Carelia dolei was a species of small, air-breathing, land snails, terrestrial pulmonate gastropod mollusks in the family  Amastridae and superfamily Cochlicopoidea.

This species was endemic to the Hawaiian Islands.

References

Carelia (gastropod)
Extinct gastropods
Taxonomy articles created by Polbot